Stephanie Patton (born August 13, 1969) is a contemporary multimedia artist whose work crosses the realms of photography, sculpture, painting, installation, performance, video, audio and text.

Life
Born in New Orleans, Louisiana, Patton received her Bachelor of Fine Arts degree in Painting from the University of Louisiana at Lafayette in 1993 and a Master of Fine Arts degree in Photography from the School of the Art Institute of Chicago in 1996.  She has studied various types of vocal and comedic performance in New York, New York through The New School, Upright Citizens Brigade Theatre and the Gotham Writers' Workshop. After living in New York City, she returned to Louisiana in 2001 and currently lives and works in Lafayette, Louisiana. She has co-curated many exhibits at the Acadiana Center for the Arts in Lafayette, Louisiana with curator Brian Guidry.

Art
Patton has shown her work nationally and internationally including shows at the Bronx Museum of the Arts in the Bronx, New York, and in New Orleans at the Ogden Museum of Southern Art, Louisiana ArtWorks, the Contemporary Arts Center (New Orleans), the Arthur Roger Gallery, the Voltz Clarke Gallery in New York, New York, the McNay Art Museum in San Antonio, Texas, and the Galerie Patricia Dorfmann in Paris, France, among others. She is also a founding member of The Front, an artist’s collective, in the St. Claude Arts District in New Orleans. Patton’s work is often humorous in nature and frequently investigates aspects of human emotion. A performance artist, Patton also has been impersonating the character Renella Rose Champagne since 1993. Renella Rose Champagne also hosts a weekly radio show "Lost in Love" on KRVS, 88.7 FM, www.krvs.org, in Lafayette, LA.

Collections
Patton’s works of art can be found in numerous private art collections throughout the world, and are included in the permanent collection of the School of the Art Institute of Chicago, Chicago, Illinois; the Frederick R. Weisman Art Foundation in Los Angeles, California; the Ogden Museum of Southern Art, New Orleans; the New Orleans Museum of Art; and the Galerie Patricia Dorfmann, Paris, France.

References

External links
 Stephanie Patton Official Website
 Stephanie Patton at the Arthur Roger Gallery, New Orleans
 Stephanie Patton at The Front, New Orleans
 Stephanie Patton at the Voltz Clarke Gallery, New York

1969 births
Artists from New Orleans
Artists from Louisiana
American contemporary painters
Living people
School of the Art Institute of Chicago alumni